Earthquake Weather is a contemporary fantasy novel by American writer Tim Powers, published in 1997. It is the third in his Fault Lines series and the sequel to his earlier novels Last Call and Expiration Date. It involves characters from both previous novels, two fugitives from a psychiatric hospital, the magical nature of multiple personality disorder, and the secret history of wine production in California.
Parts of the novel are set in the Winchester Mystery House.

It was a nominee for the BSFA Award and Bram Stoker Award in 1997, and won the Locus Award in 1998. Tor Books commissioned Michael Koelsch to illustrate a new cover art for the republishing of the book, as well as for Tim Powers' previous novel Expiration Date.

References

1997 novels
Novels by Tim Powers